The Nordoff–Robbins approach to music therapy is a therapy developed for children with psychological, physical, or developmental disabilities. It developed from the 17-year collaboration of Paul Nordoff and Clive Robbins beginning in 1958, and its early development was influenced by Rudolph Steiner and anthroposophical philosophy and teachings. Nordoff–Robbins music therapy is grounded in the belief that everyone can respond to music, no matter how ill or disabled they are. It holds that music as therapy can enhance communication, support change, and enable people to live more resourcefully and creatively. Nordoff–Robbins music therapists practice worldwide and have graduated from training programs around the world including the United Kingdom, the United States, Australia, Germany, New Zealand, Scotland, South Africa, and the Far East.

United Kingdom

Nordoff Robbins is a registered UK charity that receives no statutory funding. The charity runs the Nordoff–Robbins music therapy centre in London and a number of music therapy outreach projects nationwide. It also runs postgraduate training courses in music therapy and a research programme with public courses and conferences.

Nordoff Robbins runs the annual Silver Clef Awards that raise money for the charity.

United States

Founded by Clive Robbins and Carol Robbins, the Nordoff–Robbins Center for Music Therapy at New York University, Steinhardt School of Culture, Education, and Human Development, opened in 1989. The Center is affiliated with New York University's Graduate Music Therapy Program. The mission of the Center has six main components:

 Providing music therapy services to people with disabilities including autism spectrum disorders, behavioral disorders, developmental delays, sensory impairments, and psychiatric disorders. The Center provides individual and group therapy sessions.
 Offering advanced music therapy training.
 Conducting and publishing research. The Center maintains an extensive archive that includes recordings and documentation of the work of Nordoff and Robbins (1959–1976). The archive is continually updated by contemporary clinical work. Ongoing research in clinical practice focuses on the role of improvisational music therapy in addressing the needs of clients with different areas of disability including autism spectrum disorder, stroke, and hearing impairment.
 Presenting lectures, workshops, and symposia to professional audiences.
 Publishing musical and instructional materials to in clinical process and improvisation.
 Disseminating information and resources. The Center serves as a resource for music therapists, students, the media, and the general public. It provides consultant services, organizes seminars and workshops, and hosts over 150 visitors annually.

The Nordoff–Robbins training at Molloy College, established in 2010, is the newest approved Nordoff–Robbins program in the US. It is located at the Rebecca Center for Music Therapy at Molloy College, an outpatient center serving children and adults in the Long Island and metropolitan New York area.

Both training programs include assessment, archival coursework, clinical work, group music therapy, and clinical improvisation instruction. Trainees come from both the US and abroad.

References

External links 
Nordoff Robbins website
 EEUU: Nordoff - Robbins Center For Music Therapy
History of Nordoff-Robbins Music Therapy, The Steinhardt School, New York University
Osbournes win Silver Clef honour, BBC News, June 16, 2006

Music therapy